The 1899 Maryland Aggies football team represented Maryland Agricultural College (later part of the University of Maryland) in the 1899 college football season. In their first and only season under head coach S. S. Cooke (sometimes referenced as S. M. Cooke), the Aggies compiled a 1–4 record and were outscored by their opponents, 157 to 26. The team was shut out in all four of its intercollegiate football games; its only victory was by a 26–0 score over Eastern High School from Washington, D. C.

Schedule

References

Maryland
Maryland Terrapins football seasons
Maryland Aggies football